Diogo Ribeiro de Oliveira (born 7 January 1982) is a Brazilian footballer who currently plays as midfielder for Caxias.

Career statistics

References

External links

1982 births
Living people
Brazilian footballers
São Cristóvão de Futebol e Regatas players
Rio Branco Football Club players
Ceará Sporting Club players
Rio Branco Sport Club players
Associação Desportiva Cabofriense players
Central Sport Club players
Associação Cultural e Desportiva Potiguar players
Ferroviário Atlético Clube (CE) players
América Futebol Clube (RN) players
Brusque Futebol Clube players
Criciúma Esporte Clube players
Associação Chapecoense de Futebol players
Veranópolis Esporte Clube Recreativo e Cultural players
Esporte Clube Juventude players
Joinville Esporte Clube players
Grêmio Esportivo Brasil players
Paysandu Sport Club players
Esporte Clube São Bento players
Association football midfielders
Footballers from Rio de Janeiro (city)